In mathematics, a multiple is the product of any quantity and an integer. In other words, for the quantities a and b, it can be said that b is a multiple of a if b = na for some integer n, which is called the multiplier. If a is not zero, this is equivalent to saying that  is an integer.

When a and b are both integers, and b is a multiple of a, then a is called a divisor of b. One says also that a divides b. If a and b are not integers, mathematicians prefer generally to use integer multiple instead of multiple, for clarification. In fact, multiple is used for other kinds of product; for example, a polynomial p is a multiple of another polynomial q if there exists third polynomial r such that p = qr.

In some texts, "a is a submultiple of b" has the meaning of "a being a unit fraction of b" or, equivalently, "b being an integer multiple of a". This terminology is also used with units of measurement (for example by the BIPM and NIST), where a submultiple of a main unit is a unit, named by prefixing the main unit, defined as the quotient of the main unit by an integer, mostly a power of 103. For example, a millimetre is the 1000-fold submultiple of a metre. As another example, one inch may be considered as a 12-fold submultiple of a foot, or a 36-fold submultiple of a yard.

Examples
14, 49, −21 and 0 are multiples of 7, whereas 3 and −6 are not. This is because there are integers that 7 may be multiplied by to reach the values of 14, 49, 0 and −21, while there are no such integers for 3 and −6. Each of the products listed below, and in particular, the products for 3 and −6, is the only way that the relevant number can be written as a product of 7 and another real number:
 
 
 
 
  is not an integer;
  is not an integer.

Properties
 0 is a multiple of every number.

See also
 Unit fraction
 Ideal (ring theory)
 Decimal and SI prefix
 Multiplier (linguistics)

References

Arithmetic
Multiplication
Integers